Patricks Point (Yurok: Suemeeg)  is an unincorporated community in Humboldt County, California.

See also
Sue-meg State Park

References

Unincorporated communities in Humboldt County, California
Unincorporated communities in California
Populated coastal places in California